Ingrid Burnett is a United States politician serving in the Missouri House of Representatives. She represents district 19. A member of the Democratic Party, she previously served on the Kansas City School District school board.

Electoral History

References

Living people
People from Missouri
Year of birth missing (living people)
21st-century American politicians
Missouri Democrats